Eremias papenfussi (commonly known as Papenfuss's racerunner) is a species of lizard endemic to Iran.

References

Eremias
Reptiles described in 2011
Endemic fauna of Iran
Reptiles of Iran
Taxa named by Omid Mozaffari
Taxa named by Faraham Ahmadzadeh
Taxa named by James F. Parham